Der teutsche Merkur (English: The German Mercury) was a literary magazine published and edited by Christoph Martin Wieland. The magazine was modeled on French magazine, Mercure de France. The first issue appeared in 1773. Wieland published and edited the magazine until 1790. He used the Merkur as an organ to advance the Enlightenment and to provide a platform to support literary taste. In 1790 the title was changed to Der neue teutsche Merkur and continued publication until 1810.

Notes

External links
Der teutsche Merkur (1773-1789) online at Bielefeld University.
Der neue teutsche Merkur (1790-1810) online at Bielefeld University.
WorldCat record

Defunct literary magazines published in Germany
German-language magazines
Magazines established in 1773
Magazines disestablished in 1810